The Stade de Luxembourg is the national stadium of the Grand Duchy of Luxembourg, located in the Luxembourg City quarter of Gasperich. The stadium is host to Luxembourg's national football and rugby teams and is listed as a Category 4 stadium by UEFA allowing it to host international matches. Construction on the stadium occurred between September 2017 and July 2021, missing the original 2019 target date for completion. On 1 September 2021, the stadium marked its official opening by hosting its first international match between the Luxembourg and Azerbaijan men's football teams as part of the 2022 FIFA World Cup qualifiers. The inauguration ceremony for the stadium took place later that month, on 25 September. The Stade de Luxembourg replaces the outdated Josy Barthel stadium, due for demolition.

Design and construction

The stadium's design was drawn up by local architectural firm Beng Architectes Associés in conjunction with the Hamburg-based Gerkan, Marg and Partners, and selected from a total of 25 submissions by Luxembourg's Minister of Sport and the Mayor of Luxembourg City in September 2014. The final design and construction plans were approved by a unanimous vote of Luxembourg City councillors on 5 December 2016.

Initial ground works on the stadium began in March 2017, with construction work commencing on 21 August 2017, and an official ground breaking ceremony in the presence of Mayor Lydie Polfer held on 18 September 2017. Works were due to be completed by October 2019, with an estimated cost, at the beginning of construction, of 61.1 million euros, with 40 million euros to be covered by the Ministry of Sport, and the rest by the Luxembourg City municipality. However, due to construction delays, the stadium's completion was initially put back until 2020, before finally being completed in July 2021. Construction costs were revised up to approximately 80 million euros, with the Luxembourg City administration paying for the overrun.

Specifications

Due to its location alongside the A6 motorway, the stadium is situated along an east–west axis, in place of the more traditional north–south axis used for stadia. The stadium is designed to hold a capacity of 9,386 spectators with fully covered seating for sporting events, and can hold up to 15,000 spectators for concerts. The main grandstand is situated along the south side of the field. To cope with its dual purpose as a football and rugby venue, as well as hosting occasional concerts, the stadium is equipped with a hybrid grass playing surface.

Name
The name of the stadium was revealed as the "Stade de Luxembourg" at a press conference in July 2020. In September 2020, the Luxembourg Chamber of Deputies rejected a petition to amend the name using the Luxembourgish language after it failed to gather the minimum amount of required signatures.

Public transit

Upon the completion of the Cloche d'Or branch of Luxembourg City's new tramline in Q2 2024, the stadium will be served by the future "Stadion" tram terminus.

A 2,000-space park and ride car park, under construction across from the stadium's Route d'Esch entrance, is due to be completed in mid-2023.

See also
Luxembourg national football team
Luxembourg national rugby union team
Sport in Luxembourg
Stade Josy Barthel

References

External links

Stadium Database

Football venues in Luxembourg
Luxembourg
Sports venues in Luxembourg City
Gerkan, Marg and Partners buildings
Luxembourg
2021 establishments in Luxembourg